Plectreurys is a genus of plectreurid spiders that was first described by Eugène Louis Simon in 1893. It is one of only two genera in its family.

Species
 it contains twenty-three species, found in Costa Rica, Guatemala, Mexico, the United States, and on the Greater Antilles:
Plectreurys angela Gertsch, 1958 – USA
Plectreurys ardea Gertsch, 1958 – Mexico
Plectreurys arida Gertsch, 1958 – Mexico
Plectreurys bicolor Banks, 1898 – Mexico
Plectreurys castanea Simon, 1893 – USA
Plectreurys ceralbona Chamberlin, 1924 – Mexico
Plectreurys conifera Gertsch, 1958 – USA
Plectreurys deserta Gertsch, 1958 – USA
Plectreurys globosa Franganillo, 1931 – Cuba
Plectreurys hatibonico Alayón, 2003 – Cuba
Plectreurys janzeni Alayón & Víquez, 2011 – Guatemala to Costa Rica
Plectreurys misteca Gertsch, 1958 – Mexico
Plectreurys mojavea Gertsch, 1958 – USA
Plectreurys monterea Gertsch, 1958 – USA
Plectreurys nahuana Gertsch, 1958 – Mexico
Plectreurys oasa Gertsch, 1958 – USA
Plectreurys paisana Gertsch, 1958 – Mexico
Plectreurys schicki Gertsch, 1958 – USA
Plectreurys tecate Gertsch, 1958 – Mexico
Plectreurys tristis Simon, 1893 (type) – USA, Mexico
Plectreurys valens Chamberlin, 1924 – Mexico
Plectreurys vaquera Gertsch, 1958 – Mexico
Plectreurys zacateca Gertsch, 1958 – Mexico

See also
 List of Plectreuridae species

References

Araneomorphae genera
Fauna of California
Plectreuridae
Spiders of North America